Nephtalí De León is a Chicano writer known primarily for his poetry, children's stories, and essays. He is also credited with illustrating most of his books. He was born in Laredo, Texas in 1945 as the son of migrant workers. Although neither of his parents received much formal education, Nephtalí says that they were responsible for first exposing him to literature. He published his first book—Chicanos: Our Background and Our Pride—in the early 1960s during his senior year of high school. He then expanded his work to include poetry and plays, dabbling in mural art and children's stories on the side (his first children's book I Will Catch the Sun received great praise). He has been published in Mexico, France, the U.S., and Spain with his stories being translated into several other languages (German, Russian, Chinese, and Vietnamese). Currently, Nephtalí is a full-time poet, writer, and painter who performs lectures and poetry at schools and community events.

Themes of his works
De León depicts the "dreams, desires, and aspirations" of the Chicano people. He believes that Chicanos have been "held in psychological and spiritual bondage...and that they are cultural and intellectual hostages in American society". In his works he tries to trace how this predicament has developed throughout history and he also attempts to display the dreams and attitudes of the Chicano people. His writings are based on ancient Aztec language and culture.

References

External links
 Book Rags: Biography
 EPA: Biography

1945 births
American poets of Mexican descent
Living people
People from Laredo, Texas